Lotfabad (also romanized as Loţfābād and Lutfābād; formerly, Bāba Jām) is a city and capital of Lotfabad District, in Dargaz County, Razavi Khorasan Province, Iran. At the 2006 census, its population was 1,897, in 570 families. Located on the Iran-Turkmenistan border, it is the site of an official crossing point to Turkmenistan.

References 

Populated places in Dargaz County
Cities in Razavi Khorasan Province